Bychikha is a railway station in Bychikha, Belarus.

References 

Railway stations in Belarus
Railway stations opened in 1904